William Wilson (born 19 November 1964) is a Filipino former swimmer. He competed in four events at the 1984 Summer Olympics.
Father of Brock and Brodhi

References

External links
 

1964 births
Living people
Filipino male swimmers
Olympic swimmers of the Philippines
Swimmers at the 1984 Summer Olympics
Place of birth missing (living people)
Southeast Asian Games medalists in swimming
Southeast Asian Games gold medalists for the Philippines
Southeast Asian Games silver medalists for the Philippines
Southeast Asian Games bronze medalists for the Philippines
Asian Games medalists in swimming
Swimmers at the 1982 Asian Games
Asian Games gold medalists for the Philippines
Asian Games silver medalists for the Philippines
Asian Games bronze medalists for the Philippines
Medalists at the 1982 Asian Games
Competitors at the 1979 Southeast Asian Games
20th-century Filipino people
21st-century Filipino people